Jorge Molino Baena (born 4 March 1988) is a Spanish footballer who plays mainly as a second striker.

Club career
Born in Madrid, Molino was a youth graduate at local Atlético Madrid. He played three seasons with the reserve team in the third division, scoring ten goals in 33 games in 2009–10 for a final seventh place.

On 4 April 2010, Molino made his first-team – and La Liga – debut, coming on as a substitute for Simão Sabrosa in the 85th minute of a 3–0 home win against Deportivo de La Coruña. In the ensuing off-season, he signed a two-year contract with Real Murcia in the third level, with the Colchoneros retaining a buying option after the first year.

In late August 2011, having contributed rarely to Murcia's promotion, Molino stayed in division three and signed with CF Palencia.

References

External links

Biography at Colchonero 

1988 births
Living people
Footballers from Madrid
Spanish footballers
Association football forwards
La Liga players
Segunda División B players
Tercera División players
Atlético Madrid C players
Atlético Madrid B players
Atlético Madrid footballers
Real Murcia players
CF Palencia footballers
CF Fuenlabrada footballers